Diamond Geezer was a British television crime drama, broadcast on ITV between 20 March 2005 and 23 April 2007. Created by Caleb Ranson, the series stars David Jason as jewel thief and professional con man Des. One series of the programme was broadcast. A second series was not commissioned due to falling viewing figures, and Jason filming the first full series of A Touch of Frost since 2002.

Background
Initially broadcast as a one-off special, Diamond Geezer was commissioned for a full series of three episodes following strong viewing figures and critical acclaim. The first episode sees Des (David Jason), a long-serving prison inmate, trying to persuade a first time offender to join forces with him in his new big scam. The episode was broadcast on 20 March 2005 to an audience of nearly 10 million viewers. The three-part second series began broadcast on 9 April 2007, but did not live up to expectation, with the final episode barely scraping 4 million viewers, down from 6.2 million viewers for the first episode before finally ceasing operations for good on 23 April 2007. All four episodes were later broadcast in the United States under the title Rough Diamond.

Cast
 David Jason – Des
 Gary Whelan – Benny
 Stephen Wight – Phil Perkins

Recurring cast
 Jenny Agutter – Vanessa
 Paul Bown – Guv'nor
 Don Warrington - Hector
 George Cole – Gerald
 Carli Norris – Betsy
 Ieuan Rhys – Jenx
 Mary Tamm – Maureen
 David Troughton - D.I. Critchley
 Roy Marsden - Garovski
 Rupert Holliday-Evans - Poliarkov
 Christopher Fairbank - Barry
 Paul Freeman - Sergey

Episode list

Series Overview

Pilot (2005)

Series 1 (2007)

References

External links

2005 British television series debuts
ITV television dramas
2007 British television series endings
Television series by ITV Studios